Yio Chu Kang is a sub-urban area in the northeast of Singapore, with proximity to the Ang Mo Kio, Lentor, Seletar and Sengkang areas. Deriving its name from the Yio Chu Kang Village, it is still known for lush greenery and low-density housing with high-rise public housing in its southern fringes.

Background 
The name Yio Chu Kang, similar to Choa Chu Kang and Lim Chu Kang did not come from names of famous people unlike many other road names in Singapore. The word 'Kang' - means river, while 'Chu' was apparently a clan. The word 'Chu' itself means "owner" or "land". The clan was hence named Kangchu because it was controlled by the Chu clan and they were situated around a river. The north of Singapore was split and given to different leaders of the Kangchu clan, and they took the name of the leader. Hence the names Yio Chu Kang, Lim Chu Kang and Choa Chu Kang.

Educational institutions

Primary schools
Anderson Primary School

Secondary schools
Presbyterian High School
Yio Chu Kang Secondary School

Tertiary Institutions
Nanyang Polytechnic
Anderson Serangoon Junior College
ITE College Central

Private Housing Estates
Thomson Hills Estate
The Calrose
Castle Green
Seasons Park
Nuovo
Cactus Green
Sunrise Garden
Seletar Garden
Seletar Hills Estate
Grande Vista
Cabana
Alana
Springhill Terrace
Floravista & Floraview
Far Horizon Garden

Other Amenities
Hospitals
Ang Mo Kio- Thye Huan Kwan Hospital

Community Centres/Clubs
The Grassroots Club
Yio Chu Kang Community Club

Chinese Temples
Chu Sheng Temple
Swee Kow Kuan Temple
Liuxun Sanhemiao Joint Temple

Sports Facilities
Yio Chu Kang Sports And Recreation Centre
Yio Chu Kang Stadium
Yio Chu Kang Swimming Complex

HDB Flats
Yio Chu Kang Green
Yio Chu Kang Beacon
Yio Chu Kang Heights
Ang Mo Kio 61
Yio Chu Kang Vista

Transportation
Situated at the northern portion of Ang Mo Kio, Yio Chu Kang is served by bus services originating from Yio Chu Kang Bus Interchange, Ang Mo Kio Bus Depot, Ang Mo Kio Bus Interchange and Yishun (85x services). Yio Chu Kang MRT station also serves the area, providing residents a direct link to the relatively distant Central Area.

References

Places in Singapore
Ang Mo Kio